Beat-Club is a West German music programme that ran from September 1965 to December 1972. It was broadcast from Bremen, West Germany on Erstes Deutsches Fernsehen, the national public TV channel of the ARD, and produced by one of its members, Radio Bremen, later co-produced by WDR following the 38th episode.

History 
Beat-Club was co-created by Gerhard Augustin and Mike Leckebusch. The show premiered on 25 September 1965 with Augustin and Uschi Nerke hosting. German TV personality Wilhelm Wieben opened the first show with a short speech. After eight episodes, Augustin stepped down from his hosting role and was replaced by DJ Dave Lee Travis.

The show immediately caused a sensation and achieved cult status throughout West Germany among the youth, while the older generation hated it. The show's earlier episodes featured live performances, and was set in front of a plain brick wall. It underwent a revamp in 1967, when a more professional look was adopted with large cards in the background displaying the names of the performers. Around this time, a troupe of young women billed the "Go-Go-Girls," were introduced to dance to songs when their performers couldn't appear.

In early 1969, Travis was replaced by Dave Dee, of Dave Dee, Dozy, Beaky, Mick & Tich. On 31 December 1969, Beat-Club switched to colour and again featured live performances. Dee departed in 1970, leaving Nerke as the lone host.

In the later years of its run, the series was known for incorporating psychedelic visual effects during many performances, many concentrating on images of the performers in the background.  When the show switched to colour, the effects became much more vivid.

The Grateful Dead performed on the show on 21 April 1972, halfway through their European Tour (selections of which would make up the live album Europe '72). The band played a shorter set than usual, but still included crowd favourites such as "Truckin'". The set is believed to be the last professionally filmed appearance of Ron "Pigpen" McKernan, who retired from the band following his final gig at the Hollywood Bowl in Los Angeles shortly after the end of the tour owing to medical reasons and he later died in March 1973. In 2014, the footage had its first theatrical screening in theatres across the US.

Acts on the show 

In its seven-year run before being replaced by Musikladen the show featured artists such as the following:

Alice Cooper
Amon Düül II
The Animals
Arthur Brown
Ashton, Gardner & Dyke
Atomic Rooster
Badfinger
Barry St. John
The Beach Boys
Bee Gees
Black Sabbath
Blue Cheer
Can
Canned Heat
Captain Beefheart
Caravan 
Cherry Wainer
Chicago
Chuck Berry
Cream
Dave Davies
David Bowie
Delaney, Bonnie & Friends
Deep Purple
The Doors
The Easybeats
Emerson, Lake & Palmer
The Equals
Eric Burdon and War 
Family
Fanny
Fleetwood Mac
Fotheringay
Frank Zappa
Free
Frumpy
Gene Pitney
Grateful Dead
Guru Guru
Harry Nilsson
The Hollies
Ike & Tina Turner
Iron Butterfly
James Gang
Jethro Tull 
Jimi Hendrix
Joe Cocker
Joy & The Hit Kids
Julie Drisscoll & Brian Auger and The Trinity
King Crimson
The Kinks
Kraftwerk
The Liverbirds
Led Zeppelin
Lucifer's Friend
Lulu
Manassas
Manfred Mann
The Moody Blues
MC5
Mountain
The Move
Popol Vuh
P. P. Arnold
Redbone
Richie Havens
Robin Gibb
The Rolling Stones
Rory Gallagher
Santana
Sharon Tandy
Small Faces
Sonny & Cher
Spirit
Steppenwolf
Stone the Crows
Ten Years After
Third World War
Three Dog Night
T. Rex
UFO
Vanilla Fudge
The Walker Brothers
The Who
Yes
Zager and Evans

Performances from the show were seen on VH1 Classic, and reruns air in several European countries. Several DVD collections have also been released.

Relaunch 

Beat Club is now broadcast on Sunday afternoons between 1 and 3 pm as a weekly radio programme on Radio Bremen 1 and on a web channel offered by the radio station. The radio show is still hosted, rather nostalgically, by Nerke, reprising her role as presenter for the series.

The 2008 Video on demand web portal  launched for Beat-Club and Musikladen was replaced by a YouTube channel in 2010.

References

External links 

TV.com: Beat-Club - complete list with all tracks (in English)
Beat-Club channel on YouTube
 

Radio Bremen
German music television series
Pop music television series
1965 German television series debuts
1972 German television series endings
German-language television shows
Das Erste original programming